Kindi is a department or commune of Boulkiemdé Province in central Burkina Faso. As of 2005 it had a population of 13,033. Its capital lies at the town of Kindi.

Towns and villages
KindiKonéManéviréMasséréNassoulouZerkoum

References

Departments of Burkina Faso
Boulkiemdé Province